Robert Horák (born January 12, 1982) is a Czech former professional ice hockey defenceman.

Horák played eighteen games in the Czech Extraliga for HC Vsetín. He also played in the Slovak Extraliga for HK Dukla Trenčín, MsHK Žilina and HKm Nitra, the Asia League Ice Hockey for Hosa Ice Hockey Team and the Eredivisie for HYS The Hague.

References

External links

1982 births
Living people
HC Benátky nad Jizerou players
HC Berounští Medvědi players
Cape Breton Screaming Eagles players
Czech ice hockey defencemen
HK Dukla Trenčín players
Hull Olympiques players
HYS The Hague players
KLH Vajgar Jindřichův Hradec players
HC Kobra Praha players
BK Mladá Boleslav players
HK Nitra players
HC Olomouc players
Rouyn-Noranda Huskies players
Sioux Falls Stampede players
HC Slezan Opava players
Ice hockey people from Prague
VHK Vsetín players
MsHK Žilina players
Czech expatriate ice hockey players in Canada
Czech expatriate ice hockey players in the United States
Czech expatriate ice hockey players in Slovakia
Czech expatriate sportspeople in China
Czech expatriate sportspeople in the Netherlands
Expatriate ice hockey players in the Netherlands
Expatriate ice hockey players in China